Maulawi Ahmad Jan Ahmady, also spelt Ahmad Jan Ahmadi or Ahmadjan Ahmadi, is the director of the Administrative Office of the President of the Islamic Emirate of Afghanistan. He born in Ghazni in 1974, he has experience in administrative affairs. He started his carrier in IEA in 1994, in 1996 he was mayor of Herat, after that He worked as deputy foreign minister when Mullah Mohammad Hassan was foreign minister in Taliban's regime before US takeover, He was very close to Mullah Omar and worked as his secretary for years in 2001 he selected as ambassador to KSA.
Since 2016 he worked as director of the IEA leadership office till 2021.In September 2021 he started work as director of administrative office of president till now.

References 

Living people
Taliban government ministers of Afghanistan
Year of birth missing (living people)